Sonia Fernández (born 20 October 1966) is a Spanish diver. She competed in the women's 3 metre springboard event at the 1980 Summer Olympics.

References

1966 births
Living people
Spanish female divers
Olympic divers of Spain
Divers at the 1980 Summer Olympics
Place of birth missing (living people)